RJ, R&J, or Rj may refer to:

Arts and entertainment
 Radio jockey, a person who hosts a radio talk show
 RJ, a raccoon in the comic strip and feature film Over The Hedge
 R.J. MacReady, the helicopter pilot in the 1982 sci-fi/horror film The Thing
 RJ, an alpaca in the BT21 brand of Line Friends

Businesses and organizations
 R. J. Reynolds Tobacco Company
 Las Vegas Review-Journal, major daily newspaper in Nevada
 Les Brasseurs RJ, a brewery in Québec
 Royal Jordanian airlines, of Jordan (IATA airline designator RJ)

People

In arts and entertainment
 RJ (rapper) (born 1984), American rapper
 RJ Mitte (born 1992), American actor
 RJ Rosales (1974–2011), Australian-Filipino actor and singer
 R. J. Haddy, special effects artist, contestant on seasons 2 and 5 of the TV series Face Off
 R. J. Helton (born 1981), an American Idol finalist
 Ron Jeremy (born 1953), pornographic actor
 RJ Cyler (born 1995), American actor

In sport
 RJ Barrett (born 2000), Canadian professional basketball player for the New York Knicks
 Richard Jefferson (born 1980), former American professional basketball player and ESPN analyst
 Rick Jeanneret (born 1942), Canadian hockey announcer for the Buffalo Sabres
 Roy Jones Jr. (born 1969), former American boxer

In other fields
 Robert J. Mical (born 1956), inventor and engineer

Places
 Rio de Janeiro, a Brazilian city
 Rio de Janeiro (state), a state in Brazil

Technology
 Registered jack, a standardized telecommunication network interface
 Regional jet, a 35- to 100-passenger class of short-haul airliner
 Boeing RC-135 Rivet Joint, an American intelligence-gathering aircraft

Other uses
 Reproductive justice, a concept that links reproductive rights with social justice
 Rim job, a sexual act
 The R Journal, a statistical computing periodical (R J. per ISO 4)

Nicknames